Innisbrook is an unincorporated community in Pinellas County, Florida, United States.

References

Unincorporated communities in Florida
Unincorporated communities in Pinellas County, Florida